Proddatur railway station is the primary railway station serving Proddatur city in the Indian state of Andhra Pradesh. The station comes under the jurisdiction of Guntakal railway division of South Coastal Railway zone. A new railway line connecting Nandyal of Kurnool district commissioned recently

Structure and amenities 
The station has roof top solar panels installed by the Indian railways, along with various railway stations and service buildings in the country, as a part of sourcing 500 MW solar energy.

References 

Railway stations in Kadapa district